The 1990 Alaska gubernatorial election took place on November 6, 1990, for the open seat of Governor of Alaska. In 1989, incumbent Governor Steve Cowper, a Democrat, had announced that he would not seek re-election for a second term.

In a rare third-party win in American politics, former Republican Governor Wally Hickel, running on the ticket of the Alaskan Independence Party, defeated Democratic candidate Tony Knowles and Republican candidate Arliss Sturgulewski.

Candidates

Democratic Party
The major Democratic candidates were Tony Knowles, former mayor of Anchorage (from 1981 to 1987) and future governor (from 1994 to 2002), and incumbent Lieutenant Governor Stephen McAlpine, who had served since 1982. Knowles defeated McAlpine in the Democratic primary.

Republican Party
In the Republican primary, state senator Arliss Sturgulewski, who was also the Republican nominee in 1986, defeated Jim Campbell, Rick Halford and Don Wright.

Alaskan Independence Party
The initial Alaskan Independence Party candidate was John Lindauer, who won the primary. However, many conservative Republicans, dissatisfied with Sturgulewski's positions on social issues such as abortion, persuaded former Republican Governor Wally Hickel to run on the Alaskan Independence ticket. The party pushed Lindauer aside to make way for Hickel and lieutenant gubernatorial candidate Jack Coghill.

Others
Environmentalist and homeless rights activist Michael O'Callaghan ran as the candidate of The Political Party.

Results
Former Governor Wally Hickel defeated Knowles, Sturgulewski, and other minor candidates to return to the governor's office.

References

Gubernatorial
1990
Alaska